Mycolicibacterium aubagnense is a species of the phylum Actinomycetota (Gram-positive bacteria with high guanine and cytosine content, one of the dominant phyla of all bacteria), belonging to the genus Mycolicibacterium.

Etymology
N.L. neut. adj. aubagnense, pertaining to Aubagne, the city from where the first patient originated.

References

External links
Type strain of Mycobacterium aubagnense at BacDive -  the Bacterial Diversity Metadatabase

Acid-fast bacilli
aubagnense
Bacteria described in 2006
Mycobacteriales